Relatively Speaking may refer to:

In arts and literature:
Relatively Speaking (Ayckbourn play), by Alan Ayckbourn
Relatively Speaking (play anthology), a Broadway anthology
Relatively Speaking: Poems about Family, a 1999 young adult book of poetry by Ralph Fletcher

In music:
 "Relatively Speaking", a song from the album Seasons of the Heart by John Denver
 "Relatively Speaking", a song from the 2008 album Shiny Shady People by 3rd Alley

In other uses:
"Relatively Speaking", a track from the 1962 comedy album The First Family by Vaughn Meader
Relatively Speaking (game show), a 1980s game show
Relatively Speaking (journal), the official journal of the Alberta Genealogical Society